The Bachelor Daddy is a lost 1922 American silent comedy film directed by Alfred E. Green and written by Edward Peple and Olga Printzlau. The film stars Thomas Meighan, Leatrice Joy, Maude Wayne, Adele Farrington, J. Farrell MacDonald, Larry Wheat, and Peaches Jackson. The film was released on April 29, 1922, by Paramount Pictures.

Plot
As described in a film magazine, following the death of his mining partner Joe Pelton (MacDonald), wealthy bachelor Richard Chester (Meighan) adopts Joe's five young children and takes them east by train. The tots upset the equanimity of the passengers of the Pullman car en route to New York City, and when they arrive at Richard's home they almost drive the servants distracted. He puts them all in school except for the youngest. His fiancé Ethel McVae (Wayne), a cold society woman, refuses to have anything to do with the children and breaks their engagement when she sees how Richard reacts when his stenographer Sally Lockwood (Joy) helps him nurse the youngest child through a night's illness. The secretary wins Richard's love through the baby.

Cast
Thomas Meighan as Richard Chester
Leatrice Joy as Sally Lockwood
Maude Wayne as Ethel McVae
Adele Farrington as Mrs. McVae
J. Farrell MacDonald as Joe Pelton
Larry Wheat as Charles Henley 
Peaches Jackson as Nita 
Barbara Maier as Buddie
Bruce Guerin as Toodles
Charles De Briac as David
Raymond De Briac as Donald

References

External links

1922 films
1920s English-language films
Silent American comedy films
1922 comedy films
Paramount Pictures films
Films directed by Alfred E. Green
American black-and-white films
Lost American films
American silent feature films
1922 lost films
Lost comedy films
1920s American films